Grand River Valley is a valley surrounding rivers of that name in North America. 

One is in Canada:
Grand River (Ontario)

The remaining are in the United States:
Grand River (Michigan)
Grand River (Ohio)
Grand River Valley AVA, Ohio wine region
Grand River (Wisconsin)
Grand River (Missouri), in Iowa and Missouri
Grand River (South Dakota), in North Dakota and South Dakota